So Hyeonseong-rok is a hangeul novel written in the 17th century. The main narrative centers on the married life of So Hyeonseong and his wives. So Hyeonseong-rok, which tells the story of So Hyeonseong and his wives and Sossi samdae-rok (소씨삼대록 Story of Three Generations of the So Family), which contain stories about So Hyeonseong's children and their wives, were combined and circulated as one book, titled So Hyeonseong-rok.

Authorship 
Although the identity of the author is unknown, So Hyeonseong-rok is assumed to have been written in the 17th century, as So Hyeonseong-rok daesoseol sibochaek (蘇賢聖錄大小說十五冊 Fifteen Volumes of the Great Story of So Hyeonseong), which refers to the combination of both the So Hyeonseong-rok and Sossi samdae-rok, is mentioned in the list of novels that Lady Yi from Yongin, the mother of Kwon Seop (penname Okso), personally transcribed to hand down to her children. In addition, it is estimated that So Hyeonseong-rok was written in the late 17th century at the latest, as research revealed that a handwritten edition of Hanssi samdae-rok (韓氏三代錄 Story of Three Generations of the Han Family), a novel based on So Hyeonseong-rok, was written in 1692.

Plot 
So Hyeonseong-rok narrates the story of the life of So Hyeonseong. So Gwang and Madame Yang marry, but they are unable to have children for a long time. Years later, they finally have three children: two daughters named So Wolyeong and So Gyoyeong, and a son named So Hyeonseong. But before So Hyeonseong is born, his father passes away, leaving Madame Yang all alone to raise all three children. As the head of the family, Madame Yang raises her children with strict standards. In one incident, So Gyoyeong's father-in-law commits treason. As a result, So Gyoyeong's husband is killed and Gyoyeong is sent on an exile, where she becomes intimate with another man. Upon finding out about the affair, Madame Yang orders her own daughter to drink poison. In such a strict way, she keeps up the position and reputation of the So family. Showered with his mother's teachings and love, So Hyeonseong grows up to be a wise man. He passes the civil service exam and becomes a bureaucrat. He marries Hwa Sueun. But Seokpa, concubine to So Hyeonseong's father, is dissatisfied with Hwa Sueun's looks and personality and arranges for her niece Seok Myeonghye to be So Hyeonseong's second wife. Upset about the whole incident, Hwa Sueun finds herself at odds with So Hyeonseong and Seokpa, but Seok Myeonghye wisely manages the situation and appeases all three. But a serious problem arises when So Hyeonseong takes Madame Yeo as his third wife at the order of the emperor. Madame Yeo conspires against Hwa Sueun and Seok Myeonghye, who suffers more in particular. When Madame Yeo's evil schemes are revealed, she is kicked out of the family, and Seok Myeonghye returns home with all charges against her cleared. As a bureaucrat, So Hyeonseong continues to advance his career, serves his mother devotedly, manages the household well, and builds his family's reputation.

Sossisamdae-rok tells the stories of So Hyeonseong's children and grandchildren, or the second and third generation of the So Family. The book mainly focuses on the married couples in the second generation of the So Family. So Ungyeong marries his betrothed Wi Seonhwa, who is threatened by her stepmother; So Unseong is married to his beloved Hyeong Ganga but is forced to marry Princess Myeonghyeon by the order of the emperor, which causes conflicts in his marriage; So Unmyeong abuses his virtuous wife Yi Okju when the envious Jeong Gangseon slanders her; and So Subing becomes Kim Hyeon's second wife after years of Kim's courtship, but is ostracized by Kim's first wife and family, and is only accepted by the family after years of hardship. There are only short anecdotes about the third generation of the Yu Family in So Hyeongseong-rok. When So Semyeong, one of the third generation, plots treason against the emperor, So Unseong finds out and kills him to eliminate misfortune in the family. The So Family prospers afterward, giving birth to famous literary men during the Song Dynasty.

Features and Significance 
So Hyeonseong-rok was widely read in the late Joseon Dynasty. Other novels, such as Hanssisamdae-rok, Yeongi-rok (靈異錄 Story of Yeongi), and Seolssisamdae-rok (Story of Three Generations of the Seol Family) feature characters from So Hyeonseong-rok, and the novel Yeowa-rok (女媧錄 Story of Yeowa) and the song cycle Gwabu-ga (寡婦歌 Song of a Widow) also contain criticisms of So Hyeonseong-rok. Based on the plot of So Hyeonseong-rok, the song cycle Jaun-ga (Song of Jaun) was composed and enjoyed. All this attests to the popularity of So Hyeonseong-rok in the late Joseon Dynasty.

In addition, So Hyeonseong-rok occupies an important position in the history of Korean literature. As one of the earliest novels written in Korea, alongside Guunmong (九雲夢The Cloud Dream of the Nine), Sassi namjeonggi (謝氏南征記Record of Lady Sa's Southward Journey), Changseongamui-rok (彰善感義錄 Story of Inspiration from Good and Righteous Deeds), it is considered to have created a new literary tradition. Characters’ personalities, conflicts between married couples, focus on the family, and other aspects of the novel in terms of characters, events, and themes that are now described as characteristic of hangeul novels were established in So Hyeonseong-rok. Therefore So Hyeonseong-rok is the first novel in the genre of hangeul novels that tell the story of several generations of an upper-class family. Similar hangeul novels were written and appreciated even until the 18th and 19th centuries in Joseon Korea.

Other 
There is another novel titled Sossisamdae-rok (蘇氏三代錄 Story of Three Generations of the So Family), but it is a completely different work about calligraphy and literature of So Sun (蘇洵, pinyin: Su Xun), a literati from Song China, his sons So Sik (蘇軾, pinyin: Su Shi) and So Cheol (蘇轍, pinyin: Su Zhe), and their sons.

Texts 
There are over 20 different editions of So Hyeonseong-rok, which are all handwritten editions. Five of them are complete sets, and of the five the one housed at Ewha Womans University, consisting of fifteen chapters and fifteen volumes, is the most widely read for its detailed narrative and a stable plot.

References 

Jeong Seong-hui et al., transl., So Hyeonseong-rok Vol. 1–4, Somyung Books, 2010.

Ji Yeon-suk, transl., So Hyeonseong-rok, Munhakdongne, 2015.

“So Hyeonseong-rok,” Encyclopedia of Korean Culture, https://terms.naver.com/entry.nhn?docId=557919&cid=46641&categoryId=46641

17th-century Korean novels